The women's 100 metre breaststroke competition of the swimming events at the 1999 Pan American Games took place on 5 August at the Pan Am Pool. The last Pan American Games champion was Lisa Flood of Canada.

This race consisted of two lengths of the pool, both lengths being in breaststroke.

Results
All times are in minutes and seconds.

Heats
The first round was held on August 5.

B Final 
The B final was held on August 5.

A Final 
The A final was held on August 5.

References

Swimming at the 1999 Pan American Games
1999 in women's swimming